The 2016–17 Melbourne Stars WBBL season was the second in the team's history. Coached by David Hemp and captained by Meg Lanning, the team competed in the WBBL02 tournament.

At the conclusion of the group stage, the Stars were fifth on the ladder, and were therefore eliminated.

Squad
The following is the Stars women squad for WBBL|02.  Players with international caps are listed in bold.

Sources

Ladder

Fixtures

Group stage

References

2016–17 Women's Big Bash League season by team
Melbourne Stars (WBBL)